Morgan Phillips (born 27 March 1998) is the University of Memphis head rifle coach (2021-present). She was an American NCAA sports shooter. She competed in the 50 meter rifle prone and 50 meter rifle three positions events at junior level at the 2018 ISSF World Shooting Championships, where she won four medals, and the 2018 ISSF Junior World Cup, where she won three.

She also won the NCAA Smallbore Championship at the 2017 and 2018 NCAA Rifle Championships, while studying at West Virginia University.

References

External links
 

1998 births
Living people
American female sport shooters
West Virginia Mountaineers rifle shooters
People from Salisbury, Maryland
21st-century American women
20th-century American women